Ro-5 may refer to:

 IMAM Ro.5, an Italian sport aircraft of 1929
, an Imperial Japanese Navy submarine commissioned in 1922 and stricken in 1932